Henry Barnett, MP, JP, DL (14 February 1815 – 5 May 1896) was an English banker, landowner, Conservative Party politician, and magistrate.

He lived at Glympton Park, near Woodstock, and was the son of George Henry Barnett (1780–1871) by his marriage to Elizabeth Canning (1777–1838), a first cousin of the prime minister George Canning.

Henry Barnett's education was at Eton and Christ Church, Oxford, and in his youth he was a first-class cricketer.

He married Emily Ann Stratton on 18 September 1838; they had ten children, including the Reverend Herbert Walter Barnett who was Vicar of Bracknell 1886–1919.

He was an officer in the part-time Queen's Own Oxfordshire Hussars, being promoted to its command as Lieutenant-Colonel on 8 May 1866, and serving as its Honorary Colonel from 10 July 1878.

He was a banker, Alderman of Oxfordshire, and at the 1865 general election was elected as the Member of Parliament for Woodstock, holding the seat until he stood down from the House of Commons at the 1874 general election.

Barnett played first-class cricket from 1836 to 1839, as a member of Marylebone Cricket Club, making four appearances and totalling 32 runs with a highest score of 17.

He was born and died in London, but is buried at Glympton, Oxfordshire.

References

External links

1815 births
1896 deaths
People educated at Eton College
Conservative Party (UK) MPs for English constituencies
UK MPs 1865–1868
UK MPs 1868–1874
Deputy Lieutenants in England
English cricketers
English cricketers of 1826 to 1863
Marylebone Cricket Club cricketers
English bankers
Alumni of Christ Church, Oxford
19th-century English businesspeople
Queen's Own Oxfordshire Hussars officers